Jaroslav Narkevič (born 1 January 1962) is a Lithuanian politician. He served as Minister of Transport and Communications in the cabinet of Prime Minister Saulius Skvernelis from 7 August 2019 to 11 December 2020.

References 

Living people
1962 births
Place of birth missing (living people)
21st-century Lithuanian politicians
Members of the Seimas
Electoral Action of Poles in Lithuania – Christian Families Alliance politicians
Ministers of Transport and Communications of Lithuania